Zoramia is a genus of cardinalfishes native to the Indian and Pacific Ocean.

Species
The recognized species in this genus are:
 Zoramia flebila D. W. Greenfield, Langston & J. E. Randall, 2005
 Zoramia fragilis (J. L. B. Smith, 1961) (fragile cardinalfish)
 Zoramia gilberti (D. S. Jordan & Seale, 1905) (Gilbert's cardinalfish)
 Zoramia leptacantha (Bleeker, 1856) (threadfin cardinalfish)
 Zoramia perlita (T. H. Fraser & Lachner, 1985) (pearly cardinalfish)
 Zoramia viridiventer D. W. Greenfield, Langston & J. E. Randall, 2005

References

 
Apogonidae
Marine fish genera
Taxa named by David Starr Jordan